Estradiol/dydrogesterone (E2/DYD), sold under the brand name Femoston among others, is a combination of estradiol (E2), an estrogen, and dydrogesterone (DYD), a progestin, which is used in menopausal hormone therapy, specifically to treat and prevent hot flashes and osteoporosis, in postmenopausal women. It is taken by mouth and contains 0.5, 1, or 2 mg E2 and 2.5, 5, 10, or 20 mg DYD per tablet. The medication is marketed widely throughout the world. It is not available in the United States or Canada.

See also
 List of combined sex-hormonal preparations § Estrogens and progestogens

References

External links
 
 

Combined estrogen–progestogen formulations